Choosing Mental Illness as a Virtue is the second solo album by Pantera frontman Phil Anselmo. It was released on January 26, 2018 under Anselmo's own label, Housecore Records.

Reception
The album has received generally positive reviews from music critics.

Track list

Personnel

Philip H. Anselmo & The Illegals
 Phil Anselmo − vocals
 Steve Taylor − guitars
 Mike De Leon − guitars
 Walter Howard IV − bass
 Joe Gonzalez − drums

References

2018 albums
Phil Anselmo albums
Blackened death metal albums
Albums produced by Phil Anselmo